Wire TV was a British cable television channel produced by United Artists Cable and featured a range of entertainment, lifestyle and sports programming. Branded as "The Cable Network" was originally set up and funded with £25 million by Cable Program Partners (CPP1), a consortium of British cable operators including NYNEX, US West and Comcast to bolster alternative content from the satellite-dominated multichannel environment of the time.

Broadcast from a converted unit at The Galleries shopping centre in Bristol, Wire TV broadcast on weekdays and weekends from 1.00pm to 11.00pm with regional opt-outs from 5.00pm to 7.00pm each evening when operators could insert their own local programmes. It relied on satellite distribution to cable headends across the United Kingdom, Intelsat 601 was used and broadcast alongside both The Parliamentary Channel and The Learning Channel using the first digitally-compressed uplink service.

History

Programming
The daytime schedules consisted of talk-based Afternoon Live, quiz shows such as Lingo, soap operas and comedies. Evenings included phone-ins and sports coverage, branded as Sportswire. Weekend schedules consisting 'best of' repeats and omnibus editions of weekday soaps including Richmond Hill, The Bold and the Beautiful and Santa Barbara.

Presenters included Kathryn Apanowicz, Nino Firetto, Rhodri Evans, Fenella George and also Femi Oke who co-hosted the weekend show Soap on the Wire with television and soap opera expert Chris Stacey. The show proved popular with students and housewives alike and towards the end of 1993 was taking over 200 calls in the four hours it was on air. Producers tried to revamp it into a daily show but Stacey had other commitments and was reduced to one appearance a week so the other experts and co-presenters such as Darren Gray, Jamie Carrington-Colby, Darren Edwards and Richard Arnold were featured more frequently throughout late 1993 and 1994 all proved less popular than Stacey.

Revamp
As part of a revamp in 1994, Mike Morris and Georgey Spanswick went on the road in a bright yellow-liveried bus which was converted into an outside broadcast unit and toured the country, spending a week at a time in different cable franchise areas.

Sport
1994 also saw an expansion in the amount of sports shown on the channel following a deal with Chrysalis Group, and on 2 March of that year, Wire TV's backers outbid British Sky Broadcasting for the rights to screen the 1996 Cricket World Cup in a £7.5 million deal. It was the first major national sporting event ever to be acquired for a British cable channel, additionally the live broadcast also rights to screen Lennox Lewis' WBC title fights were secured. Other sporting coverage on the channel included Vauxhall Conference football and darts events featuring tournaments run by the BDO.

Closure
On 16 February 1995, Wire TV was sold to Mirror Television (a subsidiary of Mirror Group plc) and its new owner planned to split Wire TV into two separate channels – L!VE TV which would replace Wire, and Sportswire which would operate as a full-time service. Wire was closed on 31 May of that year; however TCI (owners of Telewest) and NYNEX made a deal with British Sky Broadcasting, which included a clause that the cable operators would not launch any rival channels to those already operated by Sky. Consequently, Sportswire collapsed just days before its planned launch which meant that L!VE TV started as Mirror's sole television channel on 12 June 1995.

See also
 Timeline of cable television in the United Kingdom
 List of former TV channels in the United Kingdom
 Bristol Channel
 Wellingborough Cablevision
 Sheffield Cablevision
 Greenwich Cablevision
 Swindon Viewpoint
 Swindon Cable
 Starview

References

Defunct television channels in the United Kingdom
Television channels and stations established in 1992
Television channels and stations disestablished in 1995
1990s in the United Kingdom
1990s in British television
History of television in the United Kingdom